General elections were held in the Isle of Man between 7 and 15 November 1929. Independent candidates won a majority of seats in the House of Keys.

Electoral system
The 24 members of the House of Keys were elected from 11 constituencies, which had between one and three seats.

Campaign
A total of 40 candidates contested the elections; 30 independents, eight from the Manx Labour Party and two from Independent Labour.

Results

By constituency

References

General election
1929
Manx general election
Manx general election